Holiday Pocono is a residential community and census-designated place (CDP) in Kidder Township, Carbon County, Pennsylvania, United States.  It is part of Northeastern Pennsylvania.

The community is located on the north side of Pennsylvania Route 534, directly north of Albrightsville. There are two small water bodies in the CDP: Holiday Lake and Placid Lake. The western edge of the community abuts Hickory Run State Park.

References

External links
Holiday Pocono Civic Association

Census-designated places in Carbon County, Pennsylvania
Census-designated places in Pennsylvania